"The Way"/"Solitaire" is the second commercial double A-side CD single by Clay Aiken released on March 16, 2004, on the RCA label. The record peaked at number four on the Billboard Hot 100 and was certified platinum.

In the summer of 2004, a cover of Neil Sedaka's "Solitaire" replaced "This Is the Night" as the bonus track on new versions of Aiken's album, Measure of a Man.

"The Way" was featured in Scooby Doo 2: Monsters Unleashed (2004).

Music video
"The Way" music video was directed by Diane Martel. Instead of the traditional Hollywood types Aiken hired everyday people to play the couples shown in this video.

Charts

References

External links
Official Clay Aiken website
Clay Aiken Videos on YouTube

2004 singles
Clay Aiken songs
Canadian Singles Chart number-one singles
Music videos directed by Diane Martel
Songs written by Kara DioGuardi